Francesco Lacquaniti is an Italian neurologist and neuroscientist. He received his medical education and completed his Neurology residency at the University of Turin.  He is Professor of Physiology at the University of Rome Tor Vergata, and the Director of the Laboratory of Neuromotor Physiology at Santa Lucia Foundation IRCCS, Rome. His research focuses on the laws of movement control in humans and other animals (including the two-thirds Power law, see Penmanship, Motor coordination, Affine curvature) and their development in children and alteration after neurological lesions (Developmental coordination disorder). He also studied the neural representation of spatial information in the brain (Brodmann area 5), the neural representation of gravity effects on the body (Mental model), and how the brain adapts to weightlessness (Locomotion in space). His scientific work has been covered in books
 and media 

 
For his work, he received the Herlitzka International Prize for Physiology, was elected to the Consiglio Universitario Nazionale, was elected to the Academia Europaea, and received a Honorary Degree in Neurosciences from the Université Catholique de Louvain

Selected publications

References

External links
Neurotree entry

Living people
1952 births
Italian neurologists
University of Turin alumni
Academic staff of the University of Rome Tor Vergata
Members of Academia Europaea
Physicians from Turin
20th-century Italian physicians
21st-century Italian physicians
National Research Council (Italy) people